Poll, polled, or polling may refer to:

Figurative head counts 
 Poll, a formal election
 Election verification exit poll, a survey taken to verify election counts
 Polling, voting to make decisions or determine opinions
 Polling places or polling station, a.k.a. the polls, where voters cast their ballots in elections

 Poll, a non-formal election:
 Opinion poll, a survey of public opinion
 Exit poll, a survey of voters taken immediately after they have exited the polling stations
 Straw poll, an ad-hoc or unofficial vote
 Survey (human research)

Agriculture 
 Poll (livestock), the top of an animal's head
 Polled livestock, hornless livestock of normally horned species
 Polling, livestock dehorning

Arts, entertainment, and media
 Poll (band), a Greek pop group of the 1970s
 Poll, the German title for the 2010 film The Poll Diaries

Mathematics, science, and technology 
 poll (Unix), a Unix system call
POLL, DNA polymerase lambda
 Polling (computer science), actively and synchronously sampling an external device's status
 Polling system, a mathematical model where a single server visits a set of queues in some order

People

Given name or middle name
 Silvia Poll Ahrens (born 1970), Central American swimmer with Olympic medal
 Poll Ashokanand (born 1940), Indian former cricketer
 Poll Shyamsunder (1924–1988), Indian cricketer

Surname
 Brian Poll (1941–1999), English cricketer
 Claudia Poll (born 1972), Central American swimmer with Olympic gold medal
 George St Poll (died 1550s), an English politician
 Graham Poll (born 1963), British referee
 Jana Franziska Poll (born 1988), German volleyball player
 Jon Poll (born 1958), American film director
 Martin Poll (1922–2012), American film and television producer
 Max Poll (1908–1991), Belgian ichthyologist
 Mihkel Poll (born 1986), Estonian pianist
 Richard D. Poll (1918–1994), American historian, academic, author
 Thomas St Poll (died 1582), member of Parliament
 Kim Polling (born 1991), Dutch judoka

Places

Austria 
 Polling im Innkreis, a municipality in the district of Braunau am Inn in Upper Austria
 Polling in Tirol, a municipality in the district of Innsbruck-Land in Tyrol

Germany 
 Poll, Cologne, a quarter of Cologne, Germany
 Polling, Mühldorf, a municipality in the district of Mühldorf in Bavaria
 Polling, Weilheim-Schongau, a municipality in the district of Weilheim-Schongau in Bavaria

Other uses 
Deed poll, a legal document binding only to a single person or party
 Poll, the part of a claw hammer head containing its driving face
 Poll tax (disambiguation), several related forms of taxation
 Polling (usually spelled "poleing"), standing up with arms to the sides in unusual public spaces; a variant of planking
 Polling or pollarding, cutting the upper part of a tree and allowing it to regrow
 Push poll, an interactive marketing technique or political [mis-]information campaign designed to appear as an opinion poll

See also 
 Paul (disambiguation)
 Pohl (disambiguation)
 Pohle (disambiguation)
 Pol (disambiguation)
 Pole (disambiguation)
 Poling (disambiguation)
 Poling (metallurgy), removing oxides when refining a metal
 Pollard (disambiguation)
 Polly (disambiguation)